Floor 17 is a 2005 Italian  thriller film written and directed by  Manetti Bros. and starring  Giampaolo Morelli.

The film  was nominated for Nastro d'Argento for best score and for David di Donatello for best visual effects.

Plot

Cast  
 Giampaolo Morelli as Marco Mancini
 Elisabetta Rocchetti as Violetta Grimaldi
 Giuseppe Soleri as Meroni
 Enrico Silvestrin as  Luca Pittana
 Antonino Iuorio as  Giovanni Borgia
 Massimo Ghini as  Matteo Mancini
 Alessandro Borgese as  Rodolfo
 Simone Colombari as  Primigi
 Caterina Corsi as  Giada
 Camilla Diana as  Lisa Mancini
 Valerio Mastandrea as Street vendor
 Enzo G. Castellari as  Vigilant

References

External links

2005 thriller films
2005 films
Italian thriller films 
Films directed by the Manetti Bros.
2000s Italian films